Robert William Bob Neuenschwander (July 4, 1948 – April 13, 2022) was an American businessman and politician.

Neuenschwander was born in Chicago, Illinois, and went to Orr High School in Orr, Minnesota, in 1966. He lived in International Falls, Minnesota with his wife and family. He served in the United States Air Force from 1969 to  1974. Neuenschwander went to Bemidji State University and was a businessman who owned a taxidermy business and gift shop: Border Bob's. Neuenschwander served in the Minnesota House of Representatives from 1983 to 1990 and was a Democrat. Neuenschwander died in International Falls, Minnesota after being ill for a long time.

References

1948 births
2022 deaths
Businesspeople from Chicago
Politicians from Chicago
People from International Falls, Minnesota
Military personnel from Illinois
Military personnel from Minnesota
Businesspeople from Minnesota
Bemidji State University alumni
Democratic Party members of the Minnesota House of Representatives